William B. Hopkins (died March 25, 1909) was an American politician from Maryland. He served as a member of the Maryland House of Delegates, representing Harford County from 1890 to 1892 and from 1900 to 1901.

Early life
William B. Hopkins was born at the family homestead near Trappe Church in Harford County, Maryland, to Amanda and J. Lee Hopkins.

Career
Hopkins was a Democrat. He served as a member of the Maryland House of Delegates, representing Harford County from 1890 to 1892 and from 1900 to 1901.

Hopkins was a farmer.

Personal life
Hopkins married Elizabeth Stephenson. They had four children, J. Lee, W. Stephenson, Annie W. and Fannie H. Silver. They lived at the family farm near Lapidum, which was previously owned by William B. Stephenson. He was a member of Rock Run United Methodist Church.

Hopkins died on March 25, 1909, at the age of 65, in Garland, near Havre de Grace. He was buried at Rock Run Cemetery.

References

Year of birth uncertain
1840s births
1909 deaths
People from Harford County, Maryland
Democratic Party members of the Maryland House of Delegates
Farmers from Maryland
Methodists from Maryland